Gürsel is both a masculine Turkish given name and a Turkish surname. Notable people with the name include:

Given name
 Gürsel Tekin, Turkish politician
Gursel Veli (born 1982), Bulgarian footballer

Surname
 Cemal Gürsel, Turkish army officer, and the fourth President of Turkey
 Nedim Gürsel, Turkish writer

Turkish-language surnames
Turkish masculine given names